Franklinville is a neighborhood of North Philadelphia, Pennsylvania.  According to the City Planning Commission, the boundaries of Franklinville are roughly a triangle bounded by West Sedgley Avenue, North Broad Street, and West Hunting Park Avenue.

Franklinville is a neighborhood that appears to no longer exist in current times as not many residents in that area use the name to describe where they live.  From the description above one would be defining a possible description of Hunting Park and perhaps its borders with Nicetown-Tioga and Fairhill (to the south of W. Sedgley).

References 

Neighborhoods in Philadelphia
Upper North Philadelphia